Andrew Sugerman is an American film producer. He attended the University of Rochester and subsequently the NYU – Tisch School of the Arts. Andrew began his career in television commercials and educational films in New York, then moved to Los Angeles, where he now resides, to work in theatrical feature films.

Career
Andrew Barry Sugerman has been involved in the production of a diverse range of motion pictures as a producer over the past thirty years. His own production, "Conviction," based on a true story, starring Hilary Swank, Sam Rockwell and Minnie Driver, directed by Tony Goldwyn, was released in October 2010 by Fox Searchlight and received many awards and critical praise.

He also produced "Foster Boy," directed by Youssef Delara, starring Matthew Modine and Lou Gossett Jr., a compelling drama based on a true story about an attorney taking on the issue of child abuse in the foster care system.

He is a producer of the feature film, "Any Day," released in May, 2015, directed by Rustam Branaman, starring Sean Bean, Eva Longoria, Tom Arnold and Kate Walsh.

Mr. Sugerman was recently co-executive producer of the one-hour drama series, "The Divide," for AMC Studios and WEtv, with the pilot written by Richard LaGravenese and directed by Tony Goldwyn, which premiered in July, 2014.

He executive produced the 2011 release, "Judy Moody and the Not Bummer Summer," based on the best-selling children's book series and starring Heather Graham, directed by John Schultz. Released in 2013 is "Crazy Kind of Love," which he executive produced, starring Virginia Madsen, Anthony LaPaglia, Zach Gilford and Eva Longoria, directed by Sarah Siegel-Magness.

Over the last few years he executive produced "Death Sentence", starring Kevin Bacon, directed by James Wan, released by Twentieth Century Fox, and the thriller "Premonition" with Sandra Bullock, which was a highly successful release from Sony Tristar. He also executive produced "Shopgirl," which has been released by Disney, starring Steve Martin, Claire Danes and Jason Schwartzman, directed by Anand Tucker, as well as the comedy "Grilled" for New Line Cinema, starring Ray Romano and Kevin James, directed by Jason Ensler.

In 2006 he executive produced the hit family road-trip comedy "Johnson Family Vacation" starring Cedric the Entertainer, Vanessa Williams and Bow Wow, for Fox Searchlight. Mr. Sugerman produced Walter Hill's boxing drama "Undisputed," starring Wesley Snipes, Ving Rhames and Peter Falk, released by Miramax. He also produced the comedy "Boat Trip," starring Cuba Gooding Jr., Roger Moore, Vivica A. Fox and Will Ferrell, released by Artisan.

He served as line producer on the caper comedy "The Whole Ten Yards," starring Bruce Willis, Matthew Perry and Amanda Peet, directed by Howard Deutch, released by Warner Bros, which followed the action-thriller "Ballistic: Ecks vs. Sever," starring Antonio Banderas and Lucy Liu, directed by Kaos, also from Warners. He also line produced the drama "Prozac Nation," based on the Elizabeth Wurtzel novel, starring Christina Ricci, Jessica Lange, Anne Heche, Jonathan Rhys-Meyers and Jason Biggs, directed by Erik Skoldbjaerg, released by Miramax.

Mr. Sugerman's extensive line producing credits also include "The Prophet's Game," starring Dennis Hopper, Stephanie Zimbalist and Sondra Locke; "Kimberly," starring Gabrielle Anwar, Sean Astin, Molly Ringwald, Patty Duke and Lainie Kazan; "The Sterling Chase," starring Alanna Ubach, Jack Noseworthy and Nicholle Tom; "Michael Angel" starring Dennis Hopper and Richard Greico, "Blue Motel," starring Sean Young, Soleil Moon Frye and Robert Vaughn; and "Spiders" starring Lana Perillo and Josh Green.

He also executive produced "Love Kills," starring Mario Van Peebles, Leslie Ann Warren, Daniel Baldwin and Louise Fletcher. As a producer and executive producer, Mr. Sugerman's credits also include "McCinsey's Island," "Mercy Street," "Somebody Is Waiting," "Savate," "Spilt Milk" and "Deadly Rivals," among others.

Additionally an accomplished director and writer, Mr. Sugerman shared the writing credit for the story of the NBC Family Special, "A Place at the Table," starring Danny Glover and Lukas Haas; and he directed the feature film comedy "Basic Training," starring Ann Dusenberry and Marty Brill.

His television credits include producing the movie thriller, "Payoff," starring Keith Carradine and Harry Dean Stanton, for Showtime; and the feature comedy "Working Trash," starring Ben Stiller and George Carlin, directed by Alan Metter, for Fox Network. Further TV credits include executive producing the special "The Bulkin Trail," starring David Hasselhoff, and producing and directing "The Hayburners." He also produced and directed "Mandy's Grandmother," starring Maureen O'Sullivan, which was released theatrically and garnered an Academy Award nomination.

Mr. Sugerman is a member of the Academy of Motion Picture Arts and Sciences, The Producers Guild of America and the Directors Guild of America.

Filmography (producer)

Films
"You Are My Home" Producer (2020)
Home Executive Producer (2020)
Wild Daze Executive Producer (2020)
"Foster Boy" Producer (2019)
"Any Day" Producer (2015)
Crazy Kind of Love Executive Producer (2012)
Judy Moody and the Not Bummer Summer Executive Producer (2011)
"Long Time Gone" Executive Producer (2011)
Conviction Producer (2009)
Death Sentence  Executive Producer.(2006)
Premonition  Executive Producer.(2006)
Grilled  Executive Producer (2005)
Shopgirl Executive Producer (2004)
Johnson Family Vacation Executive Producer (2003)
The Whole Ten Yards  Line Producer (2003)
Ballistic: Ecks vs. Sever  Line Producer (2002)
Boat Trip   Producer (2002)
Undisputed   Producer (2001)
Prozac Nation  Line Producer (2000)
Spiders  Line Producer (1999)
The Prophet's Game   Line Producer (1999)
Kimberly   Line Producer (1998)
The Sterling Chase  Line Producer (1998)
The Apostate''' Line Producer (1998)Love Kills  Executive Producer (1998)Blue Motel  Line Producer (1997)McCinsey's Island   Supervising Producer / Line Producer (1997)Mercy Street   Executive Producer (1997)Somebody is Waiting   Consulting Producer (1996)Savate  Supervising Producer (1994)Spilt Milk  Producer (1995)Deadly Rivals  Executive Producer (1993)Payoff  Producer (1993)Working Trash  Producer (1990)In Gold We Trust  Finance Executive (1989)

Filmography (director)

FilmsBasic Training:  Director.(1985)

Television

PilotsCash America:  Executive Producer.(1990)

Television specials
The Bulkin Trail: Executive Producer.(1992)The Hayburners:  Producer and Director. (1981)

Drama
"The Divide"  (TV Series) Executive Producer (2014- )Mandy's Grandmother:''  Producer and Director (1980)

References

 
https://web.archive.org/web/20080107013429/http://www.variety.com/profiles/people/main/51956/Andrew%20Sugerman.html?dataSet=1
https://www.variety.com/article/VR1117993140.html?categoryid=13&cs=1&query=andrew+sugerman

External links
 http://www.pantheonentertainment.com

People from Morristown, New Jersey
Living people
University of Rochester alumni
Tisch School of the Arts alumni
American film producers
Year of birth missing (living people)